Dan Land (born July 3, 1965) an American football coach and former player.  He played professionally in the National Football League (NFL) as a safety with the Tampa Bay Buccaneers and the Los Angeles / Oakland Raiders. He played college football at Albany State University in Albany, Georgia. He was the interim head coach at his alma mater in 2015. In 2016, he had the interim tag removed.

Head coaching record

References

1965 births
Living people
American football safeties
Albany State Golden Rams football coaches
Albany State Golden Rams football players
Los Angeles Raiders players
National Football League replacement players
New York/New Jersey Knights players
Oakland Raiders players
Tampa Bay Buccaneers players
People from Donalsonville, Georgia
Coaches of American football from Georgia (U.S. state)
Players of American football from Georgia (U.S. state)
African-American coaches of American football
African-American players of American football
20th-century African-American sportspeople
21st-century African-American sportspeople